Arab Udupi Group was a group of restaurants serving Indian food in the United Arab Emirates. The group was founded in 1978 by Kushala Shekhar Shetty with its first restaurant being located in Abu Dhabi. 

As of 2015, there were 15 restaurants in the chain in a number of UAE locations, mainly around Abu Dhabi. 
However, as of 2021, no functional restaurants are to be seen in Abu Dhabi, or any other emirate. It is not known whether this is related to the financial scandals which engulfed BR Sherry in 2020.
There were also restaurants in Dubai and Sharjah.

See also
 List of casual dining restaurant chains
 List of restaurant chains

References

External links
 Arab Udupi website
 

Restaurants established in 1978
Indian restaurants outside India
Restaurant chains in the United Arab Emirates
Tourist attractions in Abu Dhabi
Emirati companies established in 1978